Calloway County is a county located in the southwest part of the U.S. Commonwealth of Kentucky. As of the 2020 census, the population was 37,103. Its county seat is Murray. The county was founded in November 1822 and named for Colonel Richard Callaway, one of the founders of Boonesborough. Calloway County comprises the Murray, KY Micropolitan Statistical Area.  Calloway County is a moist county: the sale of alcohol in the county is prohibited, with the exception of the city of Murray.

History
Calloway County was created in 1822 from land taken from Hickman County. The courthouse was built in 1823. A fire at the courthouse in 1906 caused the almost complete destruction of the county records. Calloway county was named after Richard Callaway.

Geography

Adjacent counties
 Marshall County  (north)
 Trigg County  (northeast)
 Stewart County, Tennessee  (southeast)
 Henry County, Tennessee  (south)
 Graves County  (west)

National protected area
 Fort Donelson National Battlefield (Fort Heiman part)

Demographics

As of the census of 2000, there were 34,177 people, 13,862 households, and 8,594 families residing in the county. The racial makeup of the county was 93.48% White, 3.56% Black or African American, 0.20% Native American, 1.33% Asian, 0.03% Pacific Islander, 0.46% from other races, and 0.93% from two or more races.  1.38% of the population were Hispanic or Latino of any race.

There were 13,862 households, out of which 25.80% had children under the age of 18 living with them, 51.00% were married couples living together, 8.10% had a female householder with no husband present, and 38.00% were non-families. 29.70% of all households were made up of individuals, and 11.40% had someone living alone who was 65 years of age or older.  The average household size was 2.25 and the average family size was 2.79.

The age distribution was 18.70% under the age of 18, 19.80% from 18 to 24, 24.60% from 25 to 44, 21.90% from 45 to 64, and 15.00% who were 65 years of age or older. The median age was 34 years. The relatively large 18-to-24 population is mostly due to the presence of Murray State University. For every 100 females there were 93.20 males.  For every 100 females age 18 and over, there were 91.00 males.

The median income for a household in the county was $30,134, and the median income for a family was $39,914. Males had a median income of $31,184 versus $22,046 for females. The per capita income for the county was $16,566.  About 9.80% of families and 16.60% of the population were below the poverty line, including 17.70% of those under age 18 and 10.00% of those age 65 or over.

Politics

Communities

Cities
 Hazel
 Murray

Census-designated place
 Dexter

Other unincorporated communities

 Almo
 Backusburg
 Bethel
 Blood
 Boatwright
 Coldwater
 Crossland
 Elm Grove
 Faxon
 Harris Grove
 Hico
 Kirksey
 Lynn Grove
 Midway
 New Concord
 Penny
 Protemus
 Shiloh
 Stella
 Wadesboro
 Wiswell

Place of interest
 Fort Heiman, part of Fort Donelson National Battlefield

Notable people
 W. Earl Brown, actor/musician
 T.R.M. Howard, surgeon, civil rights leader and entrepreneur
 Joe Staton, cartoonist
 Frank Stubblefield, politician
 Nathan Stubblefield, inventor
 Harry Lee Waterfield, politician
 Molly Sims, actress/model
 Cleanth Brooks, professor, literary critic
 Mel Purcell, professional tennis player
 Jackie DeShannon, 1960s singer-songwriter
 Tim Masthay, NFL Punter, Super Bowl Champion

See also

 National Register of Historic Places listings in Calloway County, Kentucky

References

External links
 Calloway County official website

 
1822 establishments in Kentucky
Populated places established in 1822
Kentucky counties